Jonaraja  (died A.D. 1459) was a Kashmiri historian and Sanskrit poet. His  is a continuation of Kalhana's  and brings the chronicle of the kings of Kashmir down to the time of the author's patron Zain-ul-Abidin (r. 1418–1419 and 1420–1470). Jonaraja, however, could not complete the history of the patron as he died in the 35th regnal year.

In his , Jonaraja has vividly described the decline of the Hindu ruling dynasty and the rise of the Muslim ruling dynasty in Kashmir. He coined the word "Jati Vidhvansh" which means Genocide.

References

Bibliography
 Kingship in Kaśmīr (AD 1148‒1459); From the Pen of Jonarāja, Court Paṇḍit to Sulṭān Zayn al-‛Ābidīn. Critically Edited by Walter Slaje. With an Annotated Translation, Indexes and Maps. [Studia Indologica Universitatis Halensis. 7.] Halle 2014. 

Sanskrit literature
15th-century Indian poets
15th-century Indian historians
Kashmiri people
Poets from Jammu and Kashmir
Indian male poets
Scholars from Jammu and Kashmir